Richard Bate (born 27 December 1966) is an English cricketer. He played eleven first-class matches for Cambridge University Cricket Club between 1987 and 1989.

See also
 List of Cambridge University Cricket Club players

References

External links
 

1966 births
Living people
English cricketers
Cambridge University cricketers
People from Finchley